The Flight of Pony Baker is a novel for children, one of the many stories written by William Dean Howells. It was published by Harper and Brothers in 1902 in New York, New York. It tells the story of a young boy named Pony Baker who, throughout the book, attempts to run away from his home where he lives with his mother, father, and five sisters. The setting of the story is "fifty years ago" in the Boy's Town of Ohio, the state where Howells was born and raised.

Plot summary 

The story begins with Frank Baker, who is known as "Pony" after one of the boys in Boy's Town calls him by that name, so that he could be distinguished from his cousin Frank Baker.  Pony lives in the Boy's Town with his mother, father, and five sisters, whom his mother always wants him to play with. Pony's mother is very overprotective of Pony, which makes her a bad mother when it comes to having fun.

Pony's father has done some things that have given Pony the right to run away as well, but it seems to Pony that they were mostly things that his mother had put his father up to, and that his father would not have been half as bad if his mother had not influenced him. One day however, Pony almost loses all his patience after the way his father reacts to Pony being pushed down from third reader to second reader at school. That morning, Pony is asked by his teacher to read to the class, but because it is hot and because Pony was being lazy, he read very poorly despite the fact that Pony is actually a very good reader. His performance causes the teacher to push him down to the second reader. Before class is dismissed, Pony gathers his books and walks out of school towards home. His father advises him to go back to school that afternoon, which continues to upset Pony.
Pony heads back to school that afternoon with a plan to run off as soon as school is over. At recess the boys hear word of Pony's plan to run away that very night. After school, the boys tell Pony how he must run away and how they will help him. An older boy named Jim Leonard suggests that Pony go with the Indians and that the Indians would like him and then adopt him into their tribe. Jim offers to find out if there are any Indians living nearer that the reservation that is about 100 miles away from the Boy's Town.

Jim Leonard's Hair-Breadth Escape 
	Jim Leonard lives with his mother on a rise of ground near the river in a log cabin while his stable sits on the flat by the water. One year in the spring, a freshet comes about that is the worse anyone can remember. Jim spends all day on the bank with the men watching the bridge. Jim plans to stay up all night with the old men, but realizes there is nothing for him to do, so he goes home. When Jim gets home, he is concerned with whether or not his mother will be awake to whip him for being gone all day and missing supper. He decides to go to the stable-loft and falls asleep. Jim wakes up to the daylight and realizes that the flood has torn the stable apart and left him floating on the roof in the water. The current quickly pulls Jim, the roof, and a rat that is on the roof out into the middle of the river where he begins to yell for help at the houses on the shore. At that moment, the bridge begins to rush towards him. Jim continues to yell for help until both fire companies arrive. At this point, Jim decides to name the rat Bolivar, and that he will save it and keep it as a pet. Fireman Blue Bob is able to grab the roof when it breaks apart and saves Jim Leonard, but the rat falls into the water. Blue Bob says that he never saw a rat on the roof with Jim and many other people say that there never was a rat on the roof with Jim, and that he made it up.

The Scrape That Jim Leonard Got the Boys Into 
Late in the summer of that same year Jim tells Pony Baker and the boys that he knows of a watermelon patch that the owner had no use for, and the other boys demand to know where it is. Jim tells them that the patch belongs to Bunty Williams and he dares the boys to come with him to get melons. The boys set off with Jim to the watermelon patch on a sunny morning in September. On their trip through the river and the woods, Jim begins to hesitate and act as though he does not want to show the boys where the watermelon patch is. The boys encourage him to keep going and offer to help him get there when he begins to complain of a toothache. Finally, Jim rushes ahead of the boys to the patch that is about the size of an acre. The boys begin to praise Jim for leading them to the patch, but he does not participate in eating the melons and looks on while complaining of a toothache. While the boys break open the melons, Pony does not take any of them. For some reason, Pony thinks it looks wrong to take and eat them from the patch. So, Pony stands off to the side and Jim stands there with him while they watch the rest of the boys enjoy themselves.

Pony then thinks he sees someone come out of Bunty Williams' house, which is half a mile away, with a dog and a hoe in their hand. Pony makes Jim look and Jim shrieks that it is Bunty with a dog and a gun. The boys immediately run towards the woods as if Bunty had caught them stealing his melons. The boys reach the river and run through to the other side, but Jim Leonard is missing. The boys reach the shore and begin to brag about what they would have done if Bunty had caught them and what they would do to Jim if he were with them. Pony begins to be afraid that the boys would hurt Jim Leonard if they found him. Pony decides to walk home and leaves the boys behind kindling a fire to dry their clothes, which are wet from the river. Pony then climbs the riverbank and finds Jim hiding in a hole peering down at the other boys. Jim is crying and complaining of his toothache. He is afraid to go home and get beaten by his mother.

Jim and Pony leave to buy some crackers and apples to eat and go down to a pump where they drink water until they are full. They run back to the riverbank where the other boys cannot see them and build a fire of their own and bake some potatoes. As Jim begins to tell stories of Indians, Pony wonders why Bunty would have chased them if he had given up the watermelon patch, but never gets the chance to ask Jim. Pony begins to feel very sick and asks Jim to help him get home. Jim asks Pony not to tell his parents of what happened today and Pony agrees. When Pony gets home, his mother finds out what happened at the watermelon patch and that Jim Leonard put the boys up to it. The doctor comes and makes Pony feel better. The chapter ends with Pony's mother wishing that there were no such boy as Jim Leonard in the Boy's Town.

About Running Away to the Indian Reservation on a Canal-Boat, and How the Plan Failed 
As much as his mother hated Jim Leonard, Pony likes Jim and believes everything that Jim has said in spite of what had happened at the watermelon patch. Jim finds out that the closest Indian reservation is close to Lake Erie and that the best way to get there was by canal-boat. Pony does not like the idea of living so long among the Indians that he would not remember his father and mother when he would see them again, but does not tell Jim for fear of being made fun of. The next morning at school the boys hear word that Pony is planning to run away on a canal-boat to see the Indians. The boys tell Pony that he should use Piccolo Wright's father's boat to go to the reservation. The boys go to the boat and plan to travel with Pony at night and walk home. The fellows then here a shout from afar and know it to be Piccolo's father. They all run away as fast as they can and reason that they should not use the boat in fear of getting in trouble with Piccolo's father.

How the Indians Came to the Boy's Town and Jim Leonard Acted the Coward 
A group of Indians come through the Boy's Town while being moved out west by the government. The boys are excited by the arrival of the Indians and Jim tries to persuade Pony to run away with them. Pony does not want to tell Jim that he has pretty much given up the idea of running away. Things at home had gotten much better since the incident with Piccolo's father, which causes Pony to want to stay home. Jim continues to try and persuade Pony to go with the Indians until a stray arrow skims Jim's foot. Pony helps Jim home and decides against running away with the Indians and about gives up the idea of running away altogether. He has a great Fourth of July and begins to think about his cousin Frank's story about the Fourth of July a year before.

How Frank Baker Spent the Fourth at Pawpaw Bottom, and Saw the Fourth of July Boy 
Jake Milrace rides up to Frank while he is sawing wood for his mother. He asks Frank to come with him to Dave Black's house for the Fourth of July. His mother allows him to go and the two ride off together to Dave's house. When they get to Dave's, his parents do not appear to have been expecting their arrival. Dave is out in the pasture hauling rails and the boys help him throughout the heat of the day. After dinner and work, the three boys head to the swimming hole in the creek. The boys stop to eat berries out of a mulberry tree on their way. While in the tree, a light flashes into Frank' eyes and blinds him. Dave yells out at a boy in the cornfield, who had shined the light, but the boy disappears into the woods and the boys keep eating. The boys then head to the swimming hole when a thunderstorm strikes while they are on the edge of the woods. The boys decided to take off their clothes and take a shower-bath and begin to play Indians. Jake then yells at the same boy, a naked white figure, that they had seen earlier, but Frank explains that there is no other boy besides the three of them. Jake then claims to see the boy again in the barn door of the barn they are playing around. Again, the other boys do not see him. Jake then claims to see the boy again before he disappears into the woods. The storm clears out and the boys decide they no longer want to go swimming and decide to build a raft instead. While in the water, the raft gets stuck and causes Dave to fall into the water as well as the other boys who almost fall right on top of Dave. Frank gets caught in a tree at the bottom of the water and claims to have seen the same boy under water surrounded by light, but the other two did not see him. The boys spend the afternoon playing castaway sailors on the raft. Frank and Jake eventually grab their horses and head back to the Boy's Town. When they get to Frank's house, Frank's mother feeds them baked chicken and bread. The two then go out and tell of the boys about their time at Pawpaw. While watching fireworks, Frank tells his story to his mother, Pony, and Pony's father about the boy at Pawpaw who tricked them all day. The chapter closes with Pony's mother and father arguing about whether or not the Fourth of July boy at Pawpaw had really been seen by the three boys that day.

How Pony Baker Came Pretty Near Running Off With the Circus 
Right before the circus comes to town at the end of July, Pony's mother and father are walking home and Pony throws a snowball at his mother's head as a light joke. While Pony laughs, his mother grabs him and boxes his ears. His mother begins to cry and her reaction causes Pony to cry too because he did not mean to frighten his mother. This makes Pony want to run away again. On the morning of the circus the boys watch the circus procession at the corporation line. Later that day, Pony helps carry water to the circus horses when a circus man approaches him. Jim Leonard speaks to the man on behalf of Pony and says that Pony wants to join the circus. The man tells Pony to wait on his doorstep at one o'clock in the morning and the circus procession will pick him up.

How Pony Did Not Quite Get Off With the Circus 
Jim Leonard tells all the boys how Pony is going to run off. That night, Pony's father takes him and his sisters to the circus. His mother and father are very nice to him and this makes Pony's heart ache when he thinks about leaving them. After supper, Jim Leonard comes over and helps Pony pack his belongings. Pony gets into bed early and his mother comes to see him and apologizes for boxing his ears. Pony begins to cry and wraps his arms around her neck. Pony eventually falls asleep and wakes up to the sound of the circus band. He gets dressed as quickly as possible and rushes to his front steps where he sees the circus magician. Pony tries to get back into the house, so the magician cannot find him. As he reaches for the doorknob there is no door there. Pony curls into a ball in hopes that the magician will not see him. Then his father and the doctor are standing by him looking down at him. The doctor claims Pony has been walking in his sleep. Pony wakes up finding it to be morning. Pony is relieved that the circus is so far away, but becomes ill for two or three days. Pony is never actually sure if he waited on the front steps that night and seen the circus magician or not. Jim Leonard tries to help him figure out if it was a dream or not. Jim tells Pony that he wishes he had not overslept, so that he could have come said good-bye to Pony, like he said he would.

The Adventures that Pony's Cousin, Frank Baker, Had with A Pocketful of Money 
Pony likely would have never tried to run off again had it not been for Jim Leonard. His mother never liked Jim and always wanted Pony to go off with his cousin Frank. Pony wanted to ask Frank whether or not he should run away, but was ashamed to ask Frank, especially after hearing the story of how Frank delivered $2,000 from the city to the Boy's Town. When Frank was eleven, he went into the city with his mother, who was leaving to go on Frank's uncle's boat to see his grandmother along with his sisters. While in the city, a merchant from the Boy's Town needs to give $2,000 to someone who is going back home to send to his partner. When the merchant finds that Frank is going back, he stuffs the money into Frank's pocket for him to deliver. On the way home, Frank's carriage is damaged and he and his brother are forced to stay 16 miles away from home for the night. A bad thunderstorm occurs that night and Frank does not sleep because he wants to protect the money and make sure his sleeping brother is safe and breathing. Frank eventually falls into a deep sleep and does not wake up till daytime the next day and finally reaches home. Frank leaves his house after supper to take the money to the merchant's partner in town. He gives the money to the merchant's partner, he counts it, and Frank heads back home to see his father sitting on the front porch. His father tells Frank that people who have large amounts of money seem to care more for it than they do their own brothers, and they believe the things that money can buy are more precious than the things it cannot. His father then tells him to get some rest.

How Jim Leonard Planned For Pony Baker To Run Off On a Raft 
It is September when Jim tells Pony that he should run off again, and that if Pony did he would run off too. The plan is to take the boards off the shanty in the woods and build a raft and float down to the city. When schools starts, Jim and Pony are great friends and ask the teacher if they can sit next to each other at school. After school, the two hang out in the hay-loft of Pony's barn. Jim persuades Pony that they are going to need to hide provisions for when they sneak away. The first day, Jim eats the food that Pony brings and the next day, Pony's dog Trip eats the food that Jim brings. Jim tells Pony that he must train Trip not to follow him into the barn. Pony then spends time teaching Trip not to do so. It makes Pony's heart ache to do this to Trip, but he had to do it because Jim Leonard said so. They continue to eat the provisions that they had stored in the hay. Jim then tells Pony that he must leave first and that Jim will follow him as soon as the river rises. Pony does not like the idea because he thinks Jim is backing out. The plan is for Pony to sleep next Friday in the barn and to leave early the next morning. Everyone afternoon from then on Pony brings bread-and-butter with meat and hides it in the hay while Jim would bring eggs to store as well. Friday comes and Jim tells Pony that he will sleep in the barn with Pony that night and help send him off the morning. The two dig out the provisions and find there are chickens in the eggs and the meat has gone bad. Jim tells Pony that if he cannot stay with Pony that night that he will come at six the next morning to wake Pony and send him off.

How Jim Leonard Backed Out, and Pony Had to Give Up 
Pony finds Jim's constant changing of the plans to run off very odd, but does not say anything in fear of being called a cowardly-calf. Pony does not want to run off but does not see how he can help it. On Friday, Pony looks at Trip while he is standing at the barn doors and rushes towards the house to catch Trip who runs and jumps into his arms. His mother calls him in and asks why Pony is acting so quiet. She then asks if it is because Pony had a falling out with Jim Leonard and comments that she does not care for the boy. At that moment, Pony realizes he does not like Jim very much himself. Pony sneaks out that night to the barn with the lantern in his hand. When Pony gets to the loft, rats seem to swarm around him, but do not bother him. Pony is not able to fall asleep and soon begins to cry. As Pony's mother gets ready for bed, she realizes that Pony is not in his bed and that the lantern is missing. Pony's father heads into town to search for Pony, but none of the older boys had seen him, but say that Jim Leonard may know where he is. Pony's father goes to Jim's house, but his mother explains that he has been asleep for hours. He returns home and searches the house with Pony's mother who expects that the worse has happened to Pony. Finally, Pony's father goes out to the barn and hears Pony sobbing. Pony's father brings Pony back to the house where his mother holds him and kisses him while she cries. Pony explains to his mother what Jim Leonard had put him up to. At daybreak Pony's father remembers that he left his candle out in the barn when he was searching for Pony and he rushes out to get it in hopes that the barn has not burned down. While at the barn, he sees Jim Leonard sneaking towards the barn door. Pony's father pounces on Jim, grabs him by the collar, and takes Jim home where he tells his mother how he put Pony up to sneaking away. Pony gets sick for a week and his father talks with him and asks why Pony would want to run away from his home where they all love him so much. Pony explains how miserable he would have been had he run away from home and hopes that it will serve as a lesson for him. It also serves as a lesson for Pony's parents, who let Pony do more things and his mother does not baby him so much. Pony thinks this is because she is trying to be a better mother to him and, possibly, she does not baby him so much because Pony has a newborn baby brother for his mother to worry about instead, a brother who was born a week after Pony tried to run off.

Main characters
Frank "Pony" Baker: the main character of the story. He is a young boy who is little, dark, and round, with a thick crop of black hair. Nicknamed "Pony," so he would not be confused with his cousin of the same name.
Pony's mother: Pony's overprotective mother whose actions demonstrate that she thinks Pony is too little to take care of himself.
Pony's father: Pony's father whose actions towards Pony often seem to be things that Pony's mother puts him up to.
Jim Leonard: Pony's closest friend in the story who continually attempts to persuade Pony to run away from home.
Frank Baker: Pony's cousin who is a responsible and kind young man. He often takes great care of his younger brothers and younger boys in the Boy's Town. Pony's mother tries to get Pony to spend time with Frank instead of with Jim Leonard.
Jim Leonard's mother

Themes 
Throughout the book Pony plans, and is persuaded to plan, ideas of running away from his family and home. Before and after each time Pony attempts to run away, he realizes how caring and loving his family is. By the end of the book, he realizes that the things that made him want to run away are like nothing to him now and that if he had not been at home he would be miserable. The book demonstrates that even though occurrences at our homes make us mad at times, they are nothing that should make us want to leave our families because we belong in our homes with the ones we love. In addition, the book points that parents are better mothers and fathers when they do not baby their children. Rather, they should allow their children to grow and become independent individuals.

The Flight of Pony Baker is autobiographical both in its use of incidents from Howells's own boyhood and in its reflection of his mature understanding of how those incidents had formed a psychological pattern—one that Freud would certainly have called a 'nuclear complex.' Indeed, Howells shows an intuitive knowledge not only of 'Oedipal' fears and desires, but of the psychological process by which a boy moves beyond them into the 'latency period.' In a Freudian sense, the 'flight' of Pony Baker, who is nine years old, may be interpreted as an escape from the turmoil of early childhood psychosexuality. Literally, the 'flight'—which never actually happens—refers to Pony's recurrent urge to run away from home; and the novel opens with two chapters about 'why he had a right to run off'  because of his parents', and especially his mother's, mistreatment of him. Pony's naïve complaints mask a deeper conflict between his 'savage' impulses and his mother's 'civilizing' rules, which she imposes upon him directly and also indirectly by prevailing upon Pony's lenient father to support her. The rewards for Pony's resolution at the conclusion of the story are the prerogatives of growing up. Pony finds, to his pleasure, that his parents 'let him do more things,' and that his mother does not 'baby him so much before the boys.' Having become 'civilized,' he can now be trusted. Having repressed his boyish self, as figured in the "low down" Jim Leonard, Pony is ready to model himself on his manly namesake, cousin Frank Baker, who is 'one of those fellows that every mother would feel her boy was safe with.' Like the other boy-book boys, Pony Baker moves from the 'savage' into the 'civilized' realm.

The Boy Book 
"Credit for recognizing the boy book as a type is usually given to W.D. Howells, who observed in his review of Aldrich that 'no one else seems to have thought of telling the story of a boy's life, with so great desire to show what a boy's life is, and so little purpose of teaching what it should be.' Five years later Howells steered Mark Twain toward the conception of The Adventures of Tom Sawyer (1876) as 'a book for boys, pure & simple.'" Howells later contributed to the subgenre of realism with A Boy's Town (1890) and The Flight of Pony Baker (1902).

Relationship with Huck Finn and Tom Sawyer 
"Jim Leonard, the mischievous friend of Howells' protagonist, has been correctly described as 'a cross between Tom Sawyer and Huck Finn'; and there is no mistaking the genesis of such chapters as 'How Jim Leonard Planned for Pony Baker to Run Off on a Raft.' But Jim is an anti-hero—a coward and a bully whose escape plans always fail, who leaves Pony in a lurch, and who faces humiliation when he is spanked by his mother. The 'strange thing,' comments the narrator, '…was that he could have such a boy as Pony Baker under him so' (77). Jim's foil, the good Frank Baker, is presented as a role model (166), not as a figure of fun like Tom's brother Sid."

Notes

References 
 
 
 Howells, William Dean. The Flight of Pony Baker: A Boy's Town Story. New York: Harper & Brothers, 1902. Print.

External links 

1902 American novels
American children's novels
Novels set in Ohio
Works by William Dean Howells
Harper & Brothers books
Novels set in the 1850s
1902 children's books